Modern Indian language (MIL) is a term used in India to denote several Indian languages used in modern times, with or without official status. Though most Modern Indian languages are also mentioned in Eighth Schedule to the Constitution of India, it is not necessary that all languages listed in either of them is listed in other one.

Languages
Modern Indian languages are listed below.
 Assamese
 Bengali
 Boro
 Bhutia
 Gujarati
 Kashmiri
 Kannada
 Lepcha
 Limbu
 Maithili
 Malayalam
 Meitei (Manipuri) 
 Marathi
 Mizo
 Oriya
 Punjabi
 Sanskrit
 Santali
 Sindhi
 Tamil
 Telugu
 Urdu
 Dogri

Application
Most education boards in India teach at least one of the MILs in schools. UPSC requires candidates to be well versed in at least one MIL.

See also
 Less Commonly Taught Languages

References

Languages of India